CTP-dependent riboflavin kinase (Methanocaldococcus jannaschii Mj0056, Mj0056) is an enzyme with systematic name CTP:riboflavin 5′-phosphotransferase. This enzyme catalyses the following chemical reaction

 CTP + riboflavin  CDP + FMN

This archaeal enzyme uses CTP as the donor nucleotide.

References

External links 
 

EC 2.7.1